Kališe (in older sources also Kališče) is a small dispersed settlement in the Municipality of Kamnik in the Upper Carniola region of Slovenia.

Name
The name Kališe is derived from the Slovene common noun kal '(small) pond' and refers to a place with such a feature. Other Slovene toponyms with the same root include Kal, Kalce, Kališče, Kališnik, and Kalše.

Church

The local church, built on a small hill above the village, is dedicated to Saint Acacius of Ararat and is home to an important colony of the lesser horseshoe bat. The church is a chapel of ease belonging to the Parish of Gozd. The church is Gothic, dating to the second half of the 15th century, but parts of it were rebuilt on a number of occasions. The current building dates from 1753, and it features paintings dating from 1772 by Janez Potočnik.

References

External links 

Kališe on Geopedia

Populated places in the Municipality of Kamnik